The 2022 Hun Sen Cup was the 16th season of the Hun Sen Cup, the premier knockout tournament for association football clubs in Cambodia involving Cambodian Premier League, Cambodian League 2 
and provincial football clubs organized by the Football Federation of Cambodia (FFC). The competition was split into 2 stages, the provincial stage which started on 8 February 2022 and the national stage with the top four teams from provincial stage entering the play-off of national stage, competing with the teams from Cambodian League 2.

Visakha were the defending champions and successfully defended their title, winning their record-extending 3rd consecutive and overall titles on 6 November.

Provincial stage

Provincial group stage
Each group was played on a double round-robin basis at the pre-selected hosts. Group winners and runners-up advanced to Provincial quarter-finals.

Group A

Group B

Group C

Group D

Provincial​ stage quarter-finals

1st Leg

2nd Leg

Kampot won 4-3 on aggregate.

Phnmom Penh Galaxy won 7-1 on aggregate.

 
Uddor Meanchey won on penalties.

Ritthysen won 4-1 on aggregate.

Provincial stage semi-finals

1st Leg

2nd Leg

Uddor Meanchey won 5-3 on aggregate .

Phnom Penh Galaxy won 2-1 on aggregate

Provincial stage third place

Provincial stage finals

Provincial stage awards

Top goal scorer : Ung Visal of Svay Rieng Province (17 goals)
Best coach : Phann Hai of Phnom Penh Galaxy
Best goalkeeper : Sup Ahmat of Phnom Penh Galaxy

National stage 
The top four teams from Provincial stage with the 12 teams of Cambodian League 2 play in Play-off round. Winners will go to Round of 16 with the eight teams of Cambodian Premier League. Due to Tbong Khmum and Bati Youth Academy U-18 withdrew from the Cup, Electricite du Cambodge and National Police receive a bye to Round of 16.

Play-off round

1st Leg

2nd Leg

Prey Veng won 14–3 on aggregate.

Koh Kong won 9–5 on aggregate.

 
ISI Dangkor Senchey won 9–1 on aggregate.

Siem Reap won 4–3 on aggregate.

Soltilo Angkor won 4–0 on aggregate.

Asia Euro United won 4–2 on aggregate.

Round of 16

1st Leg

2nd Leg

Preah Khan Reach won 5–0 on aggregate.

Visakha won 9–2 on aggregate.

Nagaworld won 4–0 on aggregate.

Boeung Ket won 5–2 on aggregate.

Koh Kong won 4–3 on aggregate.

Phnom Penh Crown won 5–4 on aggregate.

National Army won 4–2 on aggregate.

EDC won 4–3 on aggregate.

Quarter-finals

1st Leg

2nd Leg

EDC won 4–2 on aggregate.

Visakha won 6–1 on aggregate.

Phnom Penh Crown won on penalties.

Boeung Ket won 5–3 on aggregate.

Semi-finals

1st Leg

2nd Leg

Boeung Ket won 5–0 on aggregate.

Visakha won 4–2 on aggregate.

Third place play-off

Final

Awards
Top goal scorer : Sieng Chanthea of Boeung Ket (6 goals)
Best goalkeeper : Keo Soksela of Visakha
Best player : Mat Noron of Boeung Ket
Best coach : Meas Channa of Visakha
Fair play : Visakha

See also
2022 Cambodian Premier League
2022 Cambodian League 2

References

Hun Sen Cup seasons
C-League seasons
2022 in Cambodian football
Cambodia